Saranam Gacchami is a 2017 Telugu language action-romance film, which deals with the sensitive topic of reservation in India. The film stars Navin Sanjay, Tanishq Tiwari, Posani Krishna Murali and Jaya Prakash Reddy. It was directed by Prem Raj. The movie is produced and written by Murali Bommaku under the banner of Bommaku Creations. In January 2017, the Indian Central Board of Film Certification denied certification to film on the grounds that it was "likely to affect public order and disrupt peace".

Plot

Manav, the protagonist, is a journalism scholar who researches on reservation policies, factors affecting their implementation and their outcomes. He happens to notice that the plight of the marginalized and oppressed classes for whom they were proposed didn't yield the desired fruits. He, along with his guidance, formulates what the hurdles are and how to get the desired changes forms the rest of the movie.

Cast
Navin Sanjay as Manav
Tanishq Tiwari
Jaya Prakash Reddy
Paruchuri Venkateswara Rao
Posani Krishna Murali
Sudha
Murali Bommaku
R. Krishnaiah (MLA)
Desapati Srinivas
Y. Kasi Viswanath
Satya Krishnan

Soundtrack

The music was composed by  Ravi Kalyan, and was released on Bommaku Music Company.

References

External links
http://www.123telugu.com/reviews/saranam-gacchami-telugu-movie-review.html
https://www.filmipop.com/movies/saranam-gacchami-movie-15281

2010s Telugu-language films
2017 films
Films about B. R. Ambedkar
Constitution of India
Films about the caste system in India
Cultural depictions of B. R. Ambedkar
2010s romantic action films
Indian romantic action films